The 2005–06 season was Football Club Internazionale Milano's 97th in existence and 90th consecutive season in the top flight of Italian football.

Season overview
The 2005–06 Serie A season opened with success in the Supercoppa Italiana, beating Juventus 1–0 in extra time with a goal scored by Verón. During the Champions League group stage, the side managed to have a line-up of 11 foreign players on the pitch: the only European was Luís Figo, playing the second time. Despite a good first half (also including a 3–2 win in derby, that lacked since 2002) Inter did not have a great second half, and knocked out in the Champions League by Villareal.

On the pitch, the season finished like the previous with third place and the win of the Coppa Italia against Roma. However, during the summer after the World Cup, Juventus and A.C. Milan were caught in the Calciopoli scandal: in late July, a few weeks after Italian national team triumph in Germany, Juventus was stripped of the title, and Inter was awarded the 2005–06 title. Further, the relegation of Juventus to Serie B made Inter the only club to be present in all seasons of the modern Serie A (from 1929–30).

Players

Squad information

From youth squad

Transfers

Winter

Out
 Andy van der Meyde – Everton

Pre-season and friendlies

Riscone di Brunico training camp

TIM Trophy

Südtirol Cup

Birra Moretti Trophy

Sky TV Trophy

Other friendlies

Competitions

Overview

Serie A

League table

Results summary

Results by round

Matches

Coppa Italia

Round of 16

Quarter-finals

Semi-finals

Final

Supercoppa Italiana

UEFA Champions League

Qualifying phase

Third qualifying round

Group stage

Knockout phase

Round of 16

Quarter-finals

Statistics

Squad statistics
{|class="wikitable" style="text-align: center;"
|-
!
! style="width:70px;"|League
! style="width:70px;"|Europe
! style="width:70px;"|Cup
! style="width:70px;"|Others
! style="width:70px;"|Total Stats
|-
|align=left|Games played       || 38 || 12 || 8 || 1 || 59
|-
|align=left|Games won          || 23 || 7  || 4 || 1 || 35
|-
|align=left|Games drawn        || 7  || 3  || 4 || 0 || 14
|-
|align=left|Games lost         || 8  || 2  || 0 || 0 || 10
|-
|align=left|Goals scored       || 68 || 17 || 10|| 1 || 96
|-
|align=left|Goals conceded     || 30 || 9  || 6 || 0 || 45
|-
|align=left|Goal difference    || 38 || 8  || 4 || 1 || 51
|-
|align=left|Clean sheets       || 19 || 5  || 4 || 1 || 29
|-
|align=left|Goal by substitute || – || – || – || – || –
|-
|align=left|Total shots        || – || – || – || –|| –
|-
|align=left|Shots on target    || – || – || – || –|| –
|-
|align=left|Corners            || – || – || – || –|| –
|-
|align=left|Players used       || 31 || 27 || 25 || 14 || –
|-
|align=left|Offsides           || – || – || – || –|| –
|-
|align=left|Fouls suffered     || – || – || – || –|| –
|-
|align=left|Fouls committed    || – || – || – || –|| –
|-
|align=left|Yellow cards       || 72 || 25 || 4 || 0 || 101
|-
|align=left|Red cards          || 4 || 2 || – || – || 6
|-

Appearances and goals
As of 14 May 2006

Goalscorers

Last updated: 14 May 2006

References

Notes

External links
Official website
RSSSF - Italy 2005/06

Inter Milan seasons
Internazionale
2006